Hernes is a surname. Notable people with the surname include:

Gudmund Hernes (born 1941), Norwegian politician
Helga Hernes (born 1938), German-born Norwegian political scientist, diplomat, and politician

See also
Herne (disambiguation)